The Grainger College of Engineering is the engineering college of the University of Illinois at Urbana-Champaign. It was established in 1868 and is considered one of the original units of the school.

Every engineering program in the college is ranked among the best in the US. and in the world. The department has historically spearheaded worldwide innovation in technology with inventions such as the transistor, the integrated circuit, the LED, the first web browsers (Mosaic and Netscape), and (JavaScript) all produced by students, faculty or alumni of the college. Engineering alumni founded Mozilla, AMD, PayPal, Yelp, YouTube, Tesla and Oracle.

Campus 

The College of Engineering is located at the northern terminus of the University of Illinois occupying the Bardeen Quadrangle, the Beckman Quadrangle, and many nearby areas. Green Street almost perfectly divides the Engineering campus from the rest of the University, so engineers and the College of Engineering are often referred to as "North of Green."

Engineering Hall serves as the primary anchor point for the College of Engineering and houses administrative offices as well as academic facilities.  Built in 1894, it is the oldest surviving building on the Engineering portion of campus.  It was designed by George Bullard, a University alumnus as part of a University held architecture competition and is an example of the Renaissance Revival style of architecture.

The Bardeen Quad is home to the Grainger Engineering Library, the largest engineering library in the world with over 260,000 physical volumes and a substantial electronic repository.   The building costs nearly $30 million and has 135,000 square feet (13,000 m²) of floor space.  It serves in excess of 1.5 million people annually. It offers services, including room reservations, computers, printing, scanning, copying, tutoring, and technology loans.

On April 15, 2019, the College of Engineering was named Grainger College of Engineering after the Grainger Foundation. The Grainger Foundation donated $100 million and an overall donation of $300 million.

Departments 

 Aerospace Engineering
 Bioengineering
 Civil and Environmental Engineering
 Computer Science
 Electrical and Computer Engineering
 Industrial and Enterprise Systems Engineering
 Materials Science and Engineering
 Mechanical Science and Engineering
 Nuclear, Plasma, and Radiological Engineering
 Physics

Research 
The College has the third highest per dollar research expenditure in the nation with over $202 million spent annually. The College is home to 26 research centers, 10 major laboratories, and nine affiliate programs. In total the College employs 408 research faculty members, 2,681 graduate researchers, and over 1,200 staff members.

Engineering at Illinois is the most cited institution in engineering worldwide, with the highest total citations to research papers.

Honors 
In addition to the program as a whole ranking in top five of engineering schools, many of the departments within the College of Engineering are also highly ranked.

Undergraduate rankings 
The Undergraduate programs in civil engineering, agricultural & biological engineering, and materials engineering are considered to be the top such programs in the nation. Mechanical engineering, computer engineering, computer science, electrical engineering, engineering physics, and environmental engineering consistently rank in the top five such programs in United States. The aeronautical & astronautical engineering, chemical engineering, industrial engineering, and nuclear engineering programs consistently rank within the top ten such programs in the nation.

Graduate rankings 
The graduate programs in civil engineering, agricultural & biological engineering, and materials science & engineering offered by the college are considered to be one of the top two programs in their disciplines. Additionally, the graduate programs in mechanical engineering, computer engineering, computer science, electrical engineering, and environmental engineering consistently rank within the top five such programs in the nation. The graduate programs in aerospace engineering, chemical engineering, nuclear engineering, and physics consistently rank within the top ten such programs in the nation.

Faculty honors 

The faculty of the College of Engineering has earned many honors over the course of the College's prestigious career. Currently 82 of the faculty hold named chairs or professorships, 34 are members of the National Academy of Engineering, 15 are members of the National Academy of Sciences, 15 are members of the American Academy of Arts and Sciences, two are Nobel Laureates, one  is a National Medal of Science recipient, and one is a National Medal of Technology recipient.

Notable alumni 

William F. Baker, civil engineer
Richard Baraniuk, C. Sidney Burrus Professor of Electrical and Computer Engineering at Rice University and member of the National Academy of Engineering
Stephen A. Boppart, Grainger Distinguished Chair in Engineering and head of the Biophotonics Imaging Laboratory at the University of Illinois Urbana-Champaign
Alan Bovik, Cockrell Regents Family Professor Endowed Chair in Engineering at UT Austin and member of the National Academy of Engineering
Fazlur Rahman Khan, engineered the John Hancock Center and Sears Tower; considered to be the Einstein of structural engineering and the Greatest Structural Engineer of the 20th Century
Arvind Krishna, chairman and CEO of IBM
Mark Hersam, 2014 MacArthur Fellow and Walter P. Murphy Professor of Materials Science and Engineering at Northwestern University
Sergio Verdú, information theorist, Shannon Award Laureate (2007), and member of the National Academy of Engineering and National Academy of Sciences
Alumni have created companies such as Netscape Communications, AMD, PayPal, Oracle Corporation, Siebel Systems, Lotus Software, YouTube, and Tesla, Inc.

Leadership 

Deans of the College of Engineering through the years include:

 William Schowalter, 1989-2001
 David E. Daniel, 2001-2005
 Ilesanmi Adesida, 2006-2012
 Andreas C Cangellaris, 2013-2018
 Rashid Bashir, 2018–Present

Engineering Open House 
The College of Engineering opens its doors to the public annually during Engineering Open House (EOH), the largest student-run event on the University of Illinois campus. Engineering Open House typically features over 250 student project exhibits, four design contests (College, High School, Middle School, Grade School), appearances by local and national celebrities, entertainment, competitions for visitors, and prizes.

In 2002, Bill Nye was a featured guest at Engineering Open House.

In 2020 and 2021, Engineering Open House was cancelled due to the COVID-19 pandemic.

EOH dates 
 100th Annual: April 8–9, 2022 – Theme: The Power of Us
 99th Annual: March 8–9, 2019 – Theme: Dare to Defy 
 98th Annual: March 9–10, 2018 – Theme: Drafting the Future
 97th Annual: March 10–11, 2017 – Theme: Illuminate New Horizons
 96th Annual: March 11–12, 2016 – Theme: The STEM of Innovation
 95th Annual: March 13–14, 2015 – Theme: Electrifying Engineering
 94th Annual: March 14–15, 2014 – Theme: Transform Your World 
 93rd Annual: March 8–9, 2013 – Theme: Imagine the Impossible
 92nd Annual: March 9–10, 2012 – Theme: Dream. Design. Discover.
 91st Annual: March 11–12, 2011 – Theme: Defining the future
 90th Annual: March 12–13, 2010 – Theme: Integrating knowledge, deriving genius
 89th Annual: March 13–14, 2009 – Theme: Unlocking Potential; Featured speaker: Grant Imahara from The Mythbusters
 88th Annual: March 7–8, 2008 – Theme: Sparking Curiosity
 87th Annual: March 9–10, 2007 – Theme: Inspiring Innovation
 86th Annual: March 10–11, 2006 – Theme: Beyond Imagination
 85th Annual: March 11–12, 2005 – Theme:  Reinventing Reality
 84th Annual: 2004  Theme: Engineering Ingenuity
 83rd Annual: 2003 – Theme: Create, Innovate, Fascinate
 82nd Annual: March 8–9, 2002 – Theme: Free Your Mind; Featured speaker: Bill Nye
 81st Annual: March 2–3, 2001 – Theme: Unearthed time capsule from 1975.
 80th Annual: March 3–4, 2000 – Theme: Dawn of a New Age
 79th Annual: 1999 – Theme: Millennium of Innovation
 78th Annual: 1998 – Theme: Carnival of the Mind
 77th Annual: 1997 – Theme: Imagine That
 76th Annual: 1996 – Theme: Re-Engineering The World
 75th Annual: 1995 – Theme: 75 Years of Innovation
 74th Annual: 1994 – Theme: Above and Beyond
 73rd Annual: 1993 – Theme: Forging New Frontiers
 72nd Annual: 1992 – Theme: Unleashing Tomorrow's Potential
 71st Annual: 1991 – Theme: Looking Beyond the Horizon
 70th Annual: 1990 – Theme: Dare to Discover
 69th Annual: 1989 – Theme: Reviving the Dream
 68th Annual: 1988 – Theme: Accept the Challenge
 67th Annual: 1987 – Theme: Shaping Our World
 66th Annual: 1986 – Theme: In Search of Solutions
 65th Annual: 1985 – Theme: Method to the Madness
 64th Annual: 1984 – Theme: Developing Tomorrow – Today
 63rd Annual: 1983 – Theme: Responding to Reality
 62nd Annual: 1982 – Theme: Magic of Technology
 61st Annual: 1981 – Theme: Building on Dreams
 60th Annual:  March 7–8, 1980 – Theme: Answers for the 80's
 59th Annual: 1979 – Theme: Target Tomorrow
 58th Annual: 1978 – Theme: Spearhead of Progress
 57th Annual: 1977 – Theme: Engineering: Integrating the Sciences
 56th Annual: 1976 – Theme: Revolutions in Engineering
 55th Annual: 1975 – Theme: 2001: An Engineering Odyssey
 54th Annual: 1974 – Theme: It's a Man-Made World
 53rd Annual: 1973 – Theme: Engineering Makes a World of Difference (motorola shows first cellphone)
 52nd Annual:  March 10–11, 1972 – Theme: Engineering – Key to Survival
 51st Annual:  1971 – Theme: The Engineer and Our Environment

See also 
 Beckman Institute for Advanced Science and Technology
 Coordinated Science Laboratory
 National Center for Supercomputing Applications

References

External links 
 

Engineering
Educational institutions established in 1868
Engineering schools and colleges in the United States
Engineering universities and colleges in Illinois
Engineering
1868 establishments in Illinois
W. W. Grainger